The tribe Rhynchophorini is the largest member of the true weevil subfamily Dryophthorinae. Alonso-Zarazaga and Lyal (1999) treated it as a distinct subfamily, Rhynchophorinae (in the family Dryophthoridae). Weevils of this tribe have the pygidium (VII abdominal tergite) not covered by the elytra.

This tribe includes the largest weevils of the subfamily, such as palm weevils.

Genera and selected species

 Abrachius
 Cactophagus LeConte, 1876
 Cosmopolites Chevrolat, 1885
 Cyrtotrachelus
 Cyrtotrachelus dux
 Dynamis
 Macrocheirus
 Mahakamia
 Metamasius Horn, 1873
 Omotemnus
 Otidognathus
 Paratasis
 Pristirhina
 Protocerius
 Rhodobaenus LeConte, 1876
 Rhynchodynamis
 Rhynchophorinus
 Rhynchophorus Herbst, 1795
 Rhynchophorus palmarum – American Palm Weevil
 Rhynchophorus ferrugineus – Red Palm Weevil
 Rhynchophorus cruentatus – Palmetto Weevil
 Scyphophorus Schönherr, 1838
 Sitophilus Schönherr, 1838
 Sphenophorus Schönherr, 1838

References 

Dryophthorinae